Birla Mandir in Kolkata, India, is a Hindu temple on Asutosh Chowdhury Avenue, Ballygunge, built by the industrialist Birla family. It is dedicated to Vishnu avatars such as Rama and Krishna. This temple is open in the morning from 5.30 A.M. to 11 A.M. and in the evening from 4 .30 P.M. to 9 P.M. On Janmashtami, the birthday of Krishna, devotees come from far away places to pay their respect to the deities.

History

The construction of the temple began in 1970. It took 26 years to complete the entire structure. The construction was supervised by the Sompuras.

On Wednesday, the 21st of February, 1996, the Pran Prathistha was done by Swami Chidanandaji Maharaj in the morning. Dr. Karan Singh inaugurated the temple the same day.

Location

Birla Temple is located on Ashutosh Choudhury Avenue, Ballygunge, kolkata. It is also known as Laxminarayan Mandir. Nearest metro station of Birla Mandir are Jatin Das Park and VIP Bazaar (under construction). It is 16 km from Dumdum/Kolkata Airport, 5 km from Sealdah railway station and apart from these; buses, trams, taxies etc. are also available.

Temple
The main temple houses statues of deities Krishna and Radha.
The left side temple shikhar (dome) houses goddess Durga, the Hindu goddess of Shakti, the power.
The right side dome of the temple houses Shiva in meditation mode.
Spread on 44 kathas of land, this temple built of white marble bears resemblance to the renowned Lingaraj Temple of Bhubaneswar. Birla Mandir also showcases pictorial depiction of scriptures of Bhagavad Gita in its stone engravings and some intricate Rajasthani temple architecture.  Designed by the architect Nomi Bose.

See also
Places of interest in Kolkata

References

External links

Tourist attractions in Kolkata
Hindu temples in Kolkata